The Grand Order of the Aleph Zadik Aleph (AZA or ) is an international youth-led fraternal organization for Jewish teenagers, founded in 1924 and currently existing as the male wing of BBYO Inc., an independent non-profit organization. It is for teens starting in 8th grade, through 12th grade.  AZA's sister organization, for teenage girls, is the B'nai B'rith Girls.

History

The first chapters
AZA was founded on May 3, 1924, in Omaha, Nebraska, by a group of 14 Jewish teenagers between the ages of 15 and 17.  It arose as a response of the fact that the Jewish community was, for the most part, not allowed into the Greek fraternities.  The letters were chosen to spite the fraternity the Alephs were denied from, Alpha Zeta Alpha, by naming their fraternity the Hebrew counterparts.  The first chapter, formed in 1923, was Mother Chapter AZA #1, which continues to operate. The second oldest chapter also continues to operate out of Kansas City Council and is AZA #2.

Abe Babior, the new group's first president, said that it was started "as a social and Zionist youth group."  The group's meetings would usually feature speakers on a number of both Judaic and non-Judaic topics.  The group held social events, including parties and dances.  The group's first advisor, Nathan Mnookin, an accomplished chemist, moved back to his hometown of Kansas City in November 1923, and immediately started a similar organization of the same name.  Mnookin's departure paved the way for the next AZA advisor in Omaha, Sam Beber.

A national organization
As Beber continued to serve as an advisor for the local Omaha group, he also began planning for a much larger undertaking: an international Jewish youth group.  Beber called a meeting of friends and associates in the area on May 3, 1924, reaching an understanding of goals and forming the first Supreme Advisory Committee (SAC) consisting of seven men, and officially founding the Aleph Zadik Aleph for Young Men.  The new organization's first chapter charter was granted to the existing AZA group in Omaha, dubbed "Mother Chapter" with Mnookin's second chapter in Kansas City receiving a charter a week later.  By the end of the month, new chapters had been launched in Lincoln, Nebraska and Des Moines, Iowa.

The first AZA convention was held that summer at the Jewish Community Center in Omaha, July 4–6, 1924.  Over two-thirds of the new organization's membership was present to elect their first ever Grand Aleph Godol (international president).  In a tight race which required a referral to the SAC to break a tie vote, Charles Shane emerged victorious.  In other business conducted, the boys chose to commit a third of their membership dues (at that time $3) to charity.

By the second annual convention, held in Kansas City, AZA membership had ballooned to 250 and new chapters were inaugurated in eight more cities.  Philip Klutznick, among AZA's most accomplished alumni, was elected as the 2nd Grand Aleph Godol.  During his term, he installed 10 chapters in the eastern part of the country and oversaw the creation of The Shofar, the organization's international newsletter.  Following his term in office, the organization rewarded him by making him, at the age of 19, their first executive director. Klutznick later served as Secretary of Commerce during the Jimmy Carter administration.

Involvement with B'nai B'rith

The connection between AZA and B'nai B'rith dates back to AZA's earliest days, when its founder, Sam Beber, was simultaneously serving as the AZA advisor and as the vice president of the B'nai B'rith lodge in Omaha.  Soon thereafter, the new organization was able to secure funding from the regional B'nai B'rith lodge.  At the first AZA international convention in 1924, it was resolved that the organization should seek affiliation with B'nai B'rith.  Sam Beber commenced communication, and at the executive committee meeting in January, 1925, President Adolf Kraus appointed a committee to explore the matter, headed by Henry Monsky.  A fellow Omaha resident, Monsky brought the issue of adopting "junior auxiliaries" for the forefront for the organization.  Following B'nai B'rith's international convention, in which Monsky's committee recommended the adoption of AZA as the official youth organization of B'nai B'rith, the executive committee met and immediately adopted the recommendation.

AZA enjoyed a long and prosperous relationship with B'nai B'rith, and countless youth leaders in AZA went on to hold leadership roles in B'nai B'rith as adults.  B'nai B'rith lodges often adopted AZA chapters, collaborated on joint programming and served in an advisory capacity.  AZA was eventually combined with the B'nai B'rith Girls (BBG) into what would become known as the B'nai B'rith Youth Organization (BBYO).  As the male wing of BBYO, AZA continued to maintain its unique character, traditions and rituals, even though it was administered jointly with BBG under the BBYO umbrella.

BBYO split from B'nai B'rith in 2002 and was re-formed as an independent non-profit organization.

Contrary to popular belief, AZA was not founded in a form of protest against Greek fraternities. Rather, conversations with the founding members years later revealed that the organization's name was chosen specifically in an attempt to mimic Greek fraternities—not to protest them.

Traditions

AZA logo
The AZA logo is a menorah, a seven-branched candelabrum, which is one of the central symbols of Judaism.  The menorah has a hexagonal shape in its center, with each side of the hexagon and the base of the menorah containing one of the 7 Cardinal Principles.  In the center of the hexagon is a Magen david (Star of David), and inside it are the Hebrew letters Aleph Zadik Aleph.

Password
The password "Ami" to enter an AZA meeting is now widely known and is used for ceremonial and traditional purposes only.

Aleph pin
When members ("Alephs") are inducted into the organization, they receive a pin containing the AZA logo.  This pin is to be worn at all AZA functions (including meetings, programs and conventions) as a way of visually displaying ones membership in the organization.  It is supposed to be worn on one's shirt, over the heart, to symbolize that the principles (which are inscribed on the AZA logo on the pin) are being kept close to one's heart. Aleph Pins are never to be worn straight, to represent that "no Aleph is perfect."

Songs and cheers
Many of the AZA spirit songs date back to the earliest days of the organization.  The most commonly sung song is "Up You Men", the official pep song of the organization which dates to 1931, when it was the winning entry in a song contest.  It was composed by Heinie Krinsky and Wes Bercovich from Oakland, and in modern times is sung both at fast pace as a rally song, and sometimes in a slow and somber tone as a brotherhood song.  "Come Join Us In Our Song" is a popular song to be sung conventions and summer programs, and is the longest of the AZA songs. It was originally called "Meyer Levin's Marching Song" and was written for AZA Invite by the members of Meyer Levin AZA in Chicago in 1964. The verses are sung to the tune of "The Ballad of the Greenland Whalers" and the chorus is sung to the tune of  The Coast Guard Hymn. "Sweetheart of AZA", also composed by Krinsky and Bercovich, is traditionally recited when the sweetheart (a well-liked BBG member chosen to serve in the role at various levels) enters the room, although its use in modern times varies from region to region. Lastly, Simon Wiesenthal AZA #2524 in Central Region West is noted for writing the widely sung cheer "AZA All the Way." Other official songs include "Stand Together," "Tomorrow and Today," "This Is Our Order", "No Man Is An Island", and "The General".

Guiding principles
There are "Seven Cardinal Principles" through which all AZA members (Alephs) are expected to conduct their life.  These principles underline the intent and character of the organization.  They are patriotism, Judaism, filial love, charity, conduct, purity, and fraternity.  These principles can be found inscribed on the AZA logo, and are often recited during opening rituals of business meetings.

Programming
Six programming "folds", or considerations, are used as the basis for all program planning. In 1928, Dr. Boris D. Bogen, one of the founders of the American Jewish Joint Distribution Committee, presented his ideas for the original "Five-Fold-and-Full Plan" to AZA's governing body, the Supreme Advisory Council.He proposed the addition of the original five programming folds: Social, Athletics, Community Service / Social Action, Education, and Judaism (S.A.C.E.J.) In 2020, the 97th Executive Body voted to add a sixth programing fold, 'health'. It is expected that all AZA events fall into at least one of these folds, and it is encouraged that programs span multiple folds.  A program that incorporates every fold, a "six-fold program", is considered a significant undertaking and is particularly special.

Organization

Levels
AZA is administered internationally by BBYO, Inc.'s professional staff in the international office in Washington, D.C.  Organizational units outside of North America are affiliated with BBYO, Inc. but are operated independently.  In North America, the organization is broken down into 43 geographic regions, each of which has professional staff that report to the international office.  Some regions may be further split into councils and cities depending on their size and geography, and each of these may also employ staff.  The final level is the chapter, which employs volunteer advisors, and reports to their local staff.  All members belong to a single chapter. Some BBYO programs (such as summer programs in Israel) do not require membership in BBYO.

Leadership
The organization is steered by a democratically elected board of officers on the international, regional, council and chapter levels.  The officers elected may vary from one level to the other and between different chapters and regions.  A group of elected officers is often referred to as the "executive board" or just simply the "board".  Elections are typically held annually or semi-annually.

The executive board positions that are elected at an international level (and the foundation for all other boards at all levels) are:

Aleph Godol (president)
Aleph S'gan (programming vice president)
Aleph Moreh (membership vice president)
Aleph Shaliach (Judaic vice president)
Aleph Mazkir (secretary)
Aleph Gizbor (treasurer)
Aleph Sopher (publicist)
In some places, additional officers may be elected based on need.  Each region, council and chapter may have its own constitution detailing the positions to be elected and their specific responsibilities, so long as it does not conflict with the international constitution. Additionally, each chapter may have a different variation of the positions. For example, Ruach AZA #2388 has the Mazkir and Gizbor merged into one position: The MazGiz.

See also 
List of Jewish fraternities and sororities

Notes

External links 
 Aleph Zadik Aleph and B'nai B'rith Girls Official website

B'nai B'rith
Jewish youth organizations
Jewish clubs and societies
Youth-led organizations
History of Omaha, Nebraska
Jews and Judaism in Omaha, Nebraska
High school fraternities and sororities
Fraternities and sororities in the United States
Student organizations established in 1924
1924 establishments in Nebraska
Jewish organizations established in 1924